Pirəbülqasım (also, Pirabil’kasum, Pirabul’kasim, and Pirabul’kasym) is a village and municipality in the Ismailli Rayon of Azerbaijan.  It has a population of 157.

Notable natives 

 Arastun Mahmudov — national hero of Azerbaijan.

References 

Populated places in Ismayilli District